Pedro Miguel Arce (17 June 1976 – 9 December 2022) was a Nicaraguan film and television actor based in Canada. He was known for his roles in Land of the Dead and Get Rich or Die Tryin', as well as television appearances in CSI: Miami and How I Met Your Mother.

Early life
Born and raised in Managua, Nicaragua, Pedro moved to Miami, Florida, for a few years, then he settled in Toronto, Ontario, Canada. While there Pedro surpassed others in high school football where he was captain for both the Neil McNeil Maroons and the Cedarbrae Colts. After graduation he enrolled to University of Toronto where he’d join the Varsity Blues National Championship football team. To improve his hand & foot speed for football, Pedro took Jeet Kune Do classes. Enjoying the fighting arts more, he then decided to retire from football and pursue a career in entertainment.
Pedro made some porn videos but were later taken down because of his age he did only make a couple thousand dollars

Career
Pedro moved back to the United States and lived in Los Angeles, California. He appeared in television commercials, and appeared in such shows as CSI: Miami, and How I Met Your Mother. He also featured in films such as Walt Disney's Confessions of a Teenage Drama Queen, with Lindsay Lohan, George A. Romero's Land of the Dead, Get Rich or Die Tryin' with 50 Cent and Ice Cube's Are We Done Yet?.

Personal life and death
"I am currently doing a lot of writing. I have a lot of ideas in my head, regarding different things that I like to do. I am trying to get as much of my writing done as possible. I've got a couple things completed and I am just trying to get them and bring them out to fruition. I wouldn't mind working on all sides of the camera, in front of the camera and behind the camera to do some filmmaking." 

Arce died in Toronto on 9 December 2022, at the age of 46.

Filmography
 Fall: The Price of Silence (2001) - Samoan Body Guard
 True Blue (2001) - Bouncer
 Elvis Gratton 3: Le retour d'Elvis Wong (2004) - Elvis Wong
 Confessions of a Teenage Drama Queen (2004) - Ticket Taker
 Get Rich or Die Tryin' (2005) - Cash Counting Guard
 Land of the Dead (2005) - Pillsbury
 The Red Balloon (2006) - St. Peter
 Bunny Whipped (2006) - Security Guard
 Are We Done Yet? (2007) - Georgie Pulu
 Step Brothers (2008) - Hard Wired
 Fast Glass (2008) - Punisher
 Krews (2008) - Guatemalan Gang Member
 Polar (2019) - Pedro Gonzalez Gonzales
 Queen of the Morning Calm (2019) - Chico
 The Christmas Setup (2020) - Jimmy Spencer
 Akilla's Escape (2020) - Rodrigo
 Life in a Year (2020) - Security Guard
 The End of Sex (2022) - Jory

Stunts
 Exit Wounds (2001)  - (stunt double: sumo)

Television appearances

References

External links
 
 

1976 births
2022 deaths
Nicaraguan male film actors
University of Toronto alumni
Nicaraguan male television actors
Nicaraguan expatriates in the United States
People from Managua